Albert C. "Ollie" Bashang, sometimes written as "Al Baschang" (August 22, 1888 – June 23, 1967) was an American baseball outfielder and manager. He played professional baseball for 18 years from 1910 to 1927, including two brief stints in Major League Baseball with the Detroit Tigers in 1912 and the Brooklyn Robins in 1918. He also served as manager of the Evansville Evas from 1920 to 1921.

Early years
Bashang was born in 1888 in Cincinnati.

Professional baseball
Bashang appeared in six games for the Detroit Tigers in July 1912 and two games for the Brooklyn Robins in 1918.  In Detroit, he played five games in left field, accompanied by Hall of Famers Ty Cobb in center field and Sam Crawford in right field. He had a perfect fielding percentage for the Tigers, but his batting average was .083.

He also appeared in two games for the Brooklyn Robins in 1918. He had one hit and five at bats and had no errors and an assist on his only outfield chance. He concluded his major league career with a perfect 1.000 fielding percentage on seven chances.

In addition to his two brief stints in the majors, Bashang played 18 seasons of minor league baseball from 1910 to 1927, including stints with the Junction City Soldiers (1910), Newton Railroaders (1911), Lexington Colts (1911-1912), Saginaw Ducks (1913-1915), South Bend Benders (1916-1917), Omaha Rourkes (1918-1919), Evansville Evas (1919-1921), Saginaw Aces (1923-1925), Wilkes-Barre Barons (1927), and the Wheeling Stogies (1927).  He also served as a minor league manager at Evansville in 1920 and 1921.

Family and later years
Bashang was married to Edna Klaus Bashang. He had a son, Jack. Bashang died in Cincinnati in 1967 at the age of 78. He was buried at the Vine Street Cemetery in Cincinnati.

References

External links

1888 births
1967 deaths
Major League Baseball left fielders
Brooklyn Robins players
Detroit Tigers players
Junction City Soldiers players
Newton Railroaders players
Lexington Colts players
Hannibal Cannibals players
Topeka Jayhawks players
Fort Wayne Champs players
Saginaw Ducks players
South Bend Benders players
Omaha Rourkes players
Evansville Evas players
Portsmouth Truckers players
Saginaw Aces players
Hamilton Clippers players
Bay City Wolves players
Wilkes-Barre Barons (baseball) players
Wheeling Stogies players
Baseball players from Cincinnati